General elections were held in Saint Lucia on 7 May 1974. The result was a victory for the United Workers Party, which won ten of the seventeen seats. Voter turnout was 84.4%.

Results

References

Saint Lucia
Elections in Saint Lucia
1974 in Saint Lucia
May 1974 events in North America